Dino is a surname. It may refer to:

 Abedin Dino (1843–1906), Albanian politician
 Abidin Dino (1913–1993), Turkish painter
 Ahmed Dino (1785–1849), Albanian military leader and politician
 Ali Dino (1889–1938), Albanian cartoonist and a Member of the Greek Parliament
 Gerald Nicholas Dino (born 1940), American clergyman
 Güzin Dino (1910–2013), Turkish literary scholar, linguist, translator and writer
 Kenny Dino (Kenneth J. Diono, 1939–2009), American singer
 Rasih Dino (1865–1928), Albanian politician
 Shahin Dino, Albanian politician and diplomat in the 19th and early 20th centuries
 Xhemil Dino (1894–1972), Albanian politician and diplomat

See also
 Diño, Filipino surname